Lidström classification is a system of categorizing Colles' fractures. In the Lidström classification system there are six types of fractures. The classification system is based on fracture line, direction and degree of displacement, extent of articular involvement and involvement of the distal radioulnar joint, and was first published in 1959.

Classification
 Group 1: Minimal displacement
 Group 2-A: Extra-articular, dorsal angulation
 Group 2-B: Intra-articular, dorsal angulation, joint  surface  not  comminuted
 Group 2-C: Extra-articular, dorsal angulation and dorsal displacement
 Group 2-D: Intra-articular, dorsal angulation and displacement, joint surface not comminuted
 Group 2-F: Intra-articular, dorsal angulation and displacement, joint  surface comminuted

See also
 Frykman classification
 Gartland & Werley classification
 Nissen-Lie classification
 Older's classification

Orthopedic classifications